

References

Guatemala
Massacres